Lyndey and Blair's Taste of Greece is an Australian television series first screened on SBS One in 2011. The series follows Lyndey Milan and her son Blair as they tour Greece. Before the series had screened, Blair Milan died from acute myeloid leukemia.

Episode guide

References

External links 
 Lyndey & Blair’s Taste of Greece on SBS.com.au

Special Broadcasting Service original programming
Australian cooking television series
2011 Australian television series debuts
2011 Australian television series endings